Augustówka is a part of the Mokotów district of Warsaw.

Augustówka may also refer to the following villages:
Augustówka, Lublin Voivodeship (east Poland)
Augustówka, Masovian Voivodeship (east-central Poland)
Augustówka, Warmian-Masurian Voivodeship (north Poland)